The São Vicente wall gecko (Tarentola substituta)  is a species of geckos in the family Phyllodactylidae. The species is endemic to Cape Verde, where it occurs on the islands of São Vicente and Santo Antão, where it may have been introduced.

Taxonomy
Previously a subspecies Tarentola caboverdiana substituta, it was elevated to species status in 2012.

References

Further reading
Joger, 1984 : Die Radiation der Gattung Tarentola in Makaronesien. Courier Forschungsinstitut Senckenberg, vol. 71, p. 91-111. 

substituta
Geckos of Africa
Endemic vertebrates of Cape Verde
Reptiles described in 1984
Fauna of Santo Antão, Cape Verde
Fauna of São Vicente, Cape Verde
Taxa named by Hans Joger